John Andrew may refer to:

Politicians
John Andrew (Wallingford MP), MP for Wallingford, 1360
John Andrew (Cricklade MP), MP for Cricklade, 1378–1388
John Andrew (Cambridgeshire MP), MP for Cambridgeshire, 1383
John Albion Andrew (1818–1867), Governor of Massachusetts
John Chapman Andrew (1822–1907), New Zealand politician
John F. Andrew (1850–1895), U.S. Representative from Massachusetts
Neil Andrew (John Neil Andrew, born 1944), Australian politician

Religion
John Andrew (archdeacon) (fl. 1798–1799), British Anglican priest
John Andrew (priest, born 1931) (1931–2014), British-American Anglican priest, rector of St. Thomas Church, Manhattan

Others
John Andrew (engraver), English engraver and printmaker; see Louis Prang
John Andrew (trade negotiator) (1896–1968), New Zealand farmer and trade negotiator
John Andrew (rugby league) (fl. 1960–1962), Australian rugby league player
John Andrew (rugby union, born 1993), Irish rugby union player
John Andrew (rugby union, born 1870), South African international rugby union player

See also
John Andrews (disambiguation)